Model R may refer to:

 Curtiss Model R, a WWI U.S. utility airplane
 Gee Bee Model R, a 1930s racing airplane
 Stinson Model R, a 1930s light airplane
 Wright Model R,  a 1910 airplane

See also
 R (disambiguation)
 R class (disambiguation)
 Type R (disambiguation)
 Mack R series, a Class 8 heavy-duty truck
 International Harvester R-Series, 1950s truck